The men's 3000 metres steeplechase event at the 2001 European Athletics U23 Championships was held in Amsterdam, Netherlands, at Olympisch Stadion on 12 and 14 July.

Medalists

Results

Final
14 July

Heats
12 July
Qualified: first 4 in each heat and 4 best to the Final

Heat 1

Heat 2

Participation
According to an unofficial count, 26 athletes from 19 countries participated in the event.

 (1)
 (1)
 (1)
 (1)
 (3)
 (2)
 (1)
 (2)
 (1)
 (1)
 (1)
 (2)
 (1)
 (1)
 (3)
 (1)
 (1)
 (1)
 (1)

References

3000 metres steeplechase
Steeplechase at the European Athletics U23 Championships